Rupert Bottenberg (born 19 July 1971 in Wolfville, Nova Scotia) is a Canadian illustrator, comic artist and writer.

Bottenberg grew up in Montreal.  After graduation, and many freelance jobs, he established "Comix Jams, public events centered on collaborative, improvised comic art," a concept that was picked up by many other North American cities.  His style of drawing has been called "clean-line" and full of "technical precision."

Bottenberg is currently the co-director of the En Masse collaborative art initiative, and co-creator, with writer Claude Lalumière, of the cryptomythological multimedia project Lost Myths. In 2012, Éditions TRIP released Bottenberg's first solo book, Traumstadtdenken, a collection of artworks, graphic literature and comics.

References

External links
 Home page

Living people
1971 births
Canadian illustrators
Canadian newspaper editors
Canadian male journalists
Canadian comics artists